is a former Japanese football player.

Playing career
Wada was born in Shizuoka Prefecture on May 2, 1980. He joined J1 League club Shimizu S-Pulse from youth team in 1998. He played many matches as left side midfielder in 1998. However he could not play at all in the match in 1999. In 2000, he moved to J2 League club Oita Trinita. Although he played many matches in 2000, he could hardly play in the match from 2001. In 2003, he moved to J2 club Ventforet Kofu. However he could not play at all in the match and retired end of 2003 season.

Club statistics

References

External links

geocities.co.jp

1980 births
Living people
Association football people from Shizuoka Prefecture
Japanese footballers
J1 League players
J2 League players
Shimizu S-Pulse players
Oita Trinita players
Ventforet Kofu players
Association football defenders